Syed Arabi bin Syed Abdullah Idid (born on 28 September 1944 at Alor Setar, Kedah, Malaysia) is a Malaysian scholar who serves as a Professor of Communication at the International Islamic University Malaysia (IIUM). He was the Rector of IIUM from 1 June 2006 to 1 August 2011.

Education background 
Syed Arabi Idid obtained primary education at Ibrahim School, Sungai Petani and secondary education at Sultan Abdul Hamid College at Alor Setar. He furthered his study at the University of Malaya and obtained the degree of Bachelor of Arts in History in 1968. In 1976, he was awarded with the degree of Master of Arts in Journalism from the University of Wisconsin–Madison. Ten years later, he graduated from the same as a Doctor of Philosophy in Mass Communication.

Career 
He started his career as a journalist in Bernama from 1968 to 1971. He then joined National University of Malaysia (UKM) as an administrative officer and later as a lecturer. He remained at UKM until he joined IIUM as a professor in 1999. He was the Registrar of UKM from 1978 to 1981.

Prior to his rectory in IIUM, he served as the Dean of Research Management Centre from 2001 to 2006. On 1 June 2006, he succeeded Professor Emeritus Tan Sri Dr. Mohd. Kamal Hassan as the fourth Rector of IIUM. He served such office until 1 August 2011.

Honours
  :
  Knight Companion of the Order of Loyalty to the Royal House of Kedah (DSDK) – Dato' (2000)
  Knight Commander of the Glorious Order of the Crown of Kedah (DGMK) – Dato' Wira (2011)
  :
  Grand Knight of the Order of Sultan Ahmad Shah of Pahang (SSAP) – Dato' Sri (2008)

References 

Living people
1944 births
Academic staff of the International Islamic University Malaysia
University of Malaya alumni
Academic staff of the National University of Malaysia